Sweden was present at the Eurovision Song Contest 1999, held in Jerusalem.

Before Eurovision

Melodifestivalen 1999 
Melodifestivalen 1999 was the selection for the 39th song to represent Sweden at the Eurovision Song Contest. It was the 38th time that this system of picking a song had been used. 1,315 songs were submitted to SVT for the competition, with ten songs selected to compete. The final was held in the Victoriahallen in Stockholm on 27 February 1999, presented by Anders Lundin and Vendela Kirsebom Thommesen, and was broadcast on SVT2 and Sveriges Radio's P4 network. The winner was chosen through a 50/50 jury/televoting method, which was Charlotte Nilsson with the song "Tusen och en natt", written by Gert Lengstrand and Lars Diedricsson. It got the highest number of points from both the 11 juries and the televoters. A total of 630,339 votes were cast.

Competing entries

Final

Spokespersons
 LuleåChrister Holmqvist
 UmeåAnita Färingö
 SundsvallPeter Nässén
 FalunTinna Edlund
 KarlstadJenny Eklund
 ÖrebroPäivi Kotka
 NorrköpingPer Dahlberg
 GothenburgHenrik Johnsson
 VäxjöHenrik Olsson
 MalmöPernilla Månsson
 StockholmSten Söderberg

At Eurovision
The song was translated into English for Eurovision as "Take Me To Your Heaven". Nilsson performed 15th on the night of the contest. At the end of the voting Sweden received 163 points (12 points from Bosnia and Herzegovina, Estonia, Malta, Norway and the United Kingdom), taking their fourth victory.

Voting

References

External links
TV broadcastings at SVT's open archive

1999
Countries in the Eurovision Song Contest 1999
1999
Eurovision
Eurovision